A garth is an enclosed quadrangle or yard, especially one surrounded by a cloister (Middle English; Old Norse garþr, garðr; akin to Anglo-Saxon geard). This led to the word being given as a last name to people who worked in or near a garden. Later it came to be used as a first name.

It is also possible that the name Garth comes from Gareth [ˈɡarɛθ], a Welsh masculine given name of uncertain meaning. It first appeared in this form in Thomas Malory's Le Morte d'Arthur, in which it belonged to Sir Gareth, a brother of Gawain and one of the Knights of the Round Table. Malory based it on Gahariet, a name found in French Arthurian texts; it may have a Welsh origin, perhaps connected with the name Geraint, or the word gwaredd, meaning "gentleness". It is particularly popular in Wales, and Gary is sometimes taken as a pet form of it.

Given name 
 Garth Brooks (born 1962), top-selling American country music artist
 Garth Christian, English nature writer
 Garth Crooks (born 1958), former Stoke City and Tottenham Hotspur footballer
 Garth Everett (1954-2023), American attorney and lawyer
 Garth Drabinsky (born 1949), former Canadian film and theatrical producer and entrepreneur
 Garth Ennis (born 1970), Irish comics writer
 Garth Fagan (born 1940), Jamaican choreographer
 Garth Hound, San Francisco based electronic musician
 Garth Hudson (born 1937), Canadian organist for rock group The Band
 Garth Jennings (born 1972), film director in "Hammer & Tongs" team
 Garth Nix (born 1963), Australian fantasy author
 Garth Richardson, music producer
 Garth Saloner (born c. 1955), South African-born American economist
 Garth Snow (born 1969), American ice hockey goaltender
 Garth Tander (born 1977), Australian racing driver
 Hon. Garth Turner (born 1949), Canadian MP for Halton (1988–1993 and 2006–2008)
 Garth Williams (1912–1996), American children's book illustrator

Fictional characters
 Garth, an anthropomorphic wolf from the animated film series Alpha and Omega
 Garth, Judge Henry, fictional character on the TV show The Virginian
 Garth, the Hero of Will from the video game series Fable
 Garth family, farmers in the 19th century novel Middlemarch, A Study of Provincial Life
 Garth (comic strip), hero of long-running British newspaper strip, in the 1970s drawn by Frank Bellamy and Martin Asbury
 Garth, a DC Comics superhero also known as Aqualad and Tempest
 Garth, in the Heritage of Shannara series by Terry Brooks
 Garth Algar, a main character from the skit and film series Wayne's World
 Garth Fitzgerald IV, from the series Supernatural
 Garth Marenghi, a fictional horror author
 Garth of Izar, a Fleet Captain in the Star Trek episode "Whom Gods Destroy"
 Garth Ranzz, a DC Comics character also known as Lightning Lad or Live Wire
 Garth Volbeck, a character in Ferris Bueller’s Day Off

Surname
 Brian Garth (born 1979), American singer, songwriter, guitarist, musician, sound engineer and producer, co-creator of Black Camaro
 Charles Garth (c. 1734–1784), British Member of Parliament, British Crown Agent for South Carolina, Georgia and briefly Maryland
 Jennie Garth (born 1972), American Beverly Hills, 90210 actress
 Jimmy Garth (1922–1972), Scottish footballer
 John Garth (1701–1764), British politician
 John Garth (composer) (1721–1810), English composer
 Kim Garth (born 1996), Irish women's cricketer
 Lakita Garth, African-American advocate of sexual abstinence, public speaker and author
 Leonard I. Garth (1921–2016), American judge
 Richard Garth (1820–1903), Chief Justice of Bengal and Privy Counsellor
 Samuel Garth (1661–1719), British physician
 Thomas Garth (British Army officer) (1744–1829), British Army general, chief equerry to George III
 Thomas Garth (Royal Navy) (died 1841), British Royal Navy captain

References

English masculine given names